John Small may refer to:

Politicians
John Small (Canadian politician, born 1746) (1746–1841), political figure in Upper Canada
John Small (Canadian politician, born 1831) (1831–1909), member of the Canadian House of Commons
John Francis Small (1853–1923), Member of the United Kingdom Parliament for County Wexford
John Humphrey Small (1858–1946), U.S. Representative from North Carolina

Sportspeople
John Small (cricketer) (1737–1826), English cricketer
Jack Small (1765–1836), English cricketer
John Small (American football) (1946–2012), American football player
John Small (Gaelic footballer) (born 1993), Gaelic footballer

Military figures
John Small (British Army officer) (1726–1796), active in the American Revolutionary War
John Small (gunsmith) (1759–1821), American gunsmith, sheriff, and first Indiana Adjutant General
John Small (British Army medical officer) (1823–1879), British Army deputy surgeon-general

Others
John Small (librarian) (1828–1886), librarian of the University of Edinburgh
John Bryan Small (died 1915), African-American bishop in the AME Zion Church
John Kunkel Small (1869–1938), American botanist